Frederick Martin Reiner (December 19, 1888 – November 15, 1963) was an American conductor of opera and symphonic music in the twentieth century.  Hungarian born and trained, he emigrated to the United States in 1922, where he rose to prominence as a conductor with several orchestras. He reached the pinnacle of his career while music director of the Chicago Symphony Orchestra in the 1950s and early 1960s.

Life and career

Reiner was born in Budapest, Austria-Hungary into a secular Jewish family that resided in the Pest area of the city. After preliminary studies in law at his father's urging, Reiner instead decided to pursue the study of piano, piano pedagogy, and composition at the Franz Liszt Academy. During his last two years there, his piano teacher was the young Béla Bartók. 

After early engagements at opera houses in Budapest and Dresden (June 1914 to November 1921), where he worked closely with Richard Strauss, he moved to the United States in 1922 to take the post of Principal Conductor of the Cincinnati Symphony Orchestra. He remained in this position until 1931. He become a naturalized citizen in 1928, and began to teach at the Curtis Institute in Philadelphia. Some of his pupils included Leonard Bernstein and Lukas Foss. He conducted the Pittsburgh Symphony Orchestra from 1938-1948 and made a few recordings with them for Columbia Records. He then spent several years at the Metropolitan Opera, where he conducted a historic production of Strauss's Salome in 1949, with the Bulgarian soprano Ljuba Welitsch in the title role, and the American première of Igor Stravinsky's The Rake's Progress in 1951. 

He also conducted and made a recording of the famous 1952 Metropolitan Opera production of Bizet's Carmen, starring Rise Stevens. The production was telecast on closed circuit television that year. At the time of his death he was preparing the Met's new production of Wagner's Götterdämmerung.

In 1947, Reiner appeared on camera in the film Carnegie Hall, in which he conducted the New York Philharmonic Orchestra as they accompanied violinist Jascha Heifetz in an abbreviated version of the first movement of Tchaikovsky's violin concerto.  Ten years later, Heifetz and Reiner recorded the full Tchaikovsky concerto in stereo for RCA Victor in Chicago.

Reiner's music-making had been largely American-focused since his arrival in Cincinnati. But after the Second World War he began increasing his European activity.  When he became music director of the Chicago Symphony Orchestra in 1953 he was internationally recognised. 

By common consent, the ten years that he spent in Chicago marked the height of his career, and are best-remembered today through the many recordings he made in Chicago's Orchestra Hall for RCA Victor from 1954 to 1963.  The first of these — of Ein Heldenleben by Richard Strauss — occurred on March 6, 1954 and was among RCA's first to use stereophonic sound. His last concerts in Chicago took place in the spring of 1963.

One of his last recordings, released in a special Reader's Digest boxed set, was a performance of Brahms' Symphony No. 4, recorded with the Royal Philharmonic Orchestra in October 1962 in London's Kingsway Hall.  This recording was later reissued on LP by Quintessence and on CD by Chesky.  

On September 13 and 16, 1963, Reiner conducted a group of New York musicians in Haydn's Symphony No. 101 in D major; this was followed by September 18 and 20, 1963, sessions devoted to Haydn's Symphony No. 95 in C minor.

He also appeared with members of the Chicago Symphony in a series of telecasts on Chicago's WGN-TV in 1953–54, and a later series of nationally syndicated programs called Music From Chicago. Some of these performances have been issued on DVD.  The videos clearly show his stern, disciplined demeanor, but at the conclusion of a piece, Reiner would turn to the audience and smile at them as he bowed.

Personal life

Reiner was married three times (one of them to a daughter of Etelka Gerster) and had three daughters. His health deteriorated after a heart attack in October 1960. He died in New York City on November 15, 1963, at the age of 74.

Repertoire and style
Reiner was especially noted as an interpreter of Richard Strauss and Bartók and was often seen as a modernist in his musical taste; he and his compatriot Joseph Szigeti convinced Serge Koussevitzky to commission the Concerto for Orchestra from Bartók. In reality, he had a very wide repertory and was known to admire Mozart's music above all else.

Reiner's conducting technique was defined by its precision and economy, in the manner of Arthur Nikisch and Arturo Toscanini. It typically employed quite small gestures — it has been said that the beat indicated by the tip of his baton could be contained in the area of a postage stamp — although from the perspective of the players it was extremely expressive. 

The response he drew from orchestras was one of astonishing richness, brilliance, and clarity of texture. Igor Stravinsky called the Chicago Symphony under Reiner "the most precise and flexible orchestra in the world"; it was more often than not achieved with tactics that bordered on the personally abusive, as Kenneth Morgan documents in 2005 biography of the conductor.  Chicago musicians have spoken of Reiner's autocratic methods; trumpeter Adolph Herseth told National Public Radio that Reiner often tested him and other musicians.

References

Sources

External links 
 
 
 Fritz Reiner, Conductor from Robert Meyer, Musical Reminiscences
 On Fritz Reiner's marriage
  A Biography of Fritz Reiner
 Finding aid to Fritz Reiner papers at Columbia University. Rare Book & Manuscript Library.

1888 births
1963 deaths
20th-century conductors (music)
Conductors of the Metropolitan Opera
Franz Liszt Academy of Music alumni
Grammy Award winners
Hungarian classical musicians
Hungarian conductors (music)
Male conductors (music)
American people of Hungarian-Jewish descent
Hungarian emigrants to the United States
Hungarian Jews
Jewish classical musicians
People from Pest, Hungary
Pupils of Béla Bartók
20th-century Hungarian male musicians